Pyshma is the name of several inhabited localities in Russia.

Urban localities
Pyshma, Sverdlovsk Oblast, a work settlement in Pyshminsky District of Sverdlovsk Oblast

Rural localities
Pyshma, Tyumen Oblast, a village in Chikchinsky Rural Okrug of Tyumensky District of Tyumen Oblast